Negoiu Peak is a mountain peak in the Făgăraș Mountains of the Southern Carpathians, being located in Sibiu County, Romania, with an elevation of . It is the second highest peak in Romania after Moldoveanu Peak.

References

External links

Mountains of Romania
Mountains of the Southern Carpathians